Sa Re Ga Ma Pa Challenge 2007 is an Indian television singing competition that premiered on 4 May 2007 and ran until 13 October 2007. It is the 2nd instalment of the "Sa Re Ga Ma Pa Challenge" series and the 4th public voting competition in the "Sa Re Ga Ma Pa" series. Chronologically, the show is preceded by Sa Re Ga Ma Pa L'il Champs, however systematically it is followed by Sa Re Ga Ma Pa Challenge 2005. The show features two of the previous mentors, Himesh Reshammiya and Ismail Darbar, and two new mentors to the Challenge series, Bappi Lahiri and Vishal–Shekhar. Shaan did not return to host and was replaced by Aditya Narayan, son of playback singer, Udit Narayan.

The new logo is significantly different from the 2005 logo. It features headphones on a globe to represent itself as an international competition, instead of a previous logo consisting of a portrayal of a duet singing.

On 13 October at the Grand Finale, the show broke voting records with a collection of 10,61,44,354 (10.6 crores or 106 million) votes worldwide from 181 countries. In the final tally Aneek Dhar was declared the winner with 3,65,89,134 votes, Raja Hasan as the 1st runner-up with 3,52,40,963 votes and Amanat Ali as the 2nd runner-up with 3,43,14,257 votes.

Gharana selection
The Gharana (literally "House") is utilised similarly to a House system used in schools and colleges. The contestants of the gharanas have been chosen by the mentors themselves.

Two of the four previous gharanas that were featured on Sa Re Ga Ma Pa Challenge 2005 have been replaced – Aadesh Shrivastava's Jai Ho and Jatin–Lalit's Dum have now been replaced with "Josh" and "Hit Squad". The following list represents the initial 32 contestants who were chosen by the mentors and in the order they were introduced.

Yalgaar – Ismail Darbar

 Rimi Dhar from Jabalpur, Madhya Pradesh, India -Eliminated on Episode 21: 13 July
 Jyoti Mishra from Azamgarh, Uttar Pradesh, India – Eliminated on Episode 14: 16 June
 Desh Gaurav Singh from Pratapgarh, Uttar Pradesh, India – Eliminated on Episode 6: 19 May
 Wasi Efandi from Karachi, Pakistan – Eliminated on Episode 15: 22 June
 Brijesh Shandilya  from Basti, Uttar Pradesh, India – Eliminated on Episode 12: 9 June
 Poonam Yadav from Lucknow, Uttar Pradesh, India – 3rd runner-up. Eliminated on Episode 43: 28 September
 Amanat Ali from Faisalabad, Pakistan – Mega finalist and 2nd runner-up.

Rock – Himesh Reshammiya
 Amrita Chatterjee from Kolkata, West Bengal, India – Eliminated on Episode 6: 19 May
 Yogendra Pathak from London, England, United Kingdom – Eliminated on Episode 4: 12 May
 Tushar Sinha from Silchar, Assam, India – Eliminated on Episode 10: 2 June
 Anita Bhatt from Lucknow, Uttar Pradesh, India – Eliminated on Episode 12: 9 June
 Shreshta Banerjee from Kolkata, West Bengal, India – Eliminated on Episode 15: 22 June
 Nirupama Dey from Agartala, Tripura, India – Eliminated on Episode 25: 27 July
 Joy Chakraborty from Lumding, Assam, India – Eliminated on Episode 29: 10 August
 Mussarat Abbas Pakistan ki Shaan From Lahore, Pakistan - Eliminated on Episode 39: 14 September
 Aneek Dhar  from Kolkata, West Bengal, India – WINNER

Josh – Bappi Lahiri
 Reecha Tripaathi from Vancouver, British Columbia, Canada  –  Eliminated on Episode 16: 23 June
 Sunil Kumar  from Sunder Nagar, Himachal Pradesh, India –  Eliminated on Episode 16: 23 June
 Koyel Chaterjee from Dhanbad, Jharkhand, India – Eliminated on Episode 4: 12 May
 Sikandar Ali from Karachi, Pakistan – Eliminated on Episode 14: 16 June
 Abhijeet Kosambi (Sa Re Ga Ma Pa Marathi winner)  from Kolhapur, Maharashtra, India  Eliminated on Episode 27: 3 August
 Mauli Dave from Houston, United States – Eliminated on Episode 37: 7 September
 Sumedha Karmahe from Rajnandgaon, Chhattisgarh, India – 4th Runner-up. Eliminated on Episode 41: 21 September

Hit Squad – Vishal–Shekhar
 Apurva Shah from Mumbai, India Eliminated on Episode 23: 20 July
 Saaberi Bhattacharya from Kolkata, West Bengal, India Eliminated on Episode 16: 23 June
 Meghna Verma from Pune, Maharashtra, India – Eliminated on Episode 10: 2 June
 Sarika Singh from Indore, Madhya Pradesh, India – Eliminated on Episode 8: 26 May
 Imran Aslam from Johannesburg, South Africa – Eliminated on Episode 8: 26 May
 Sumana Ganguly from Toronto, Ontario, Canada – Eliminated on Episode 15: 22 June
 Junaid Sheikh from Karachi, PakistanVoted Out: 24 August
 Harpreet Deol from Ludhiana, Punjab, India – Eliminated on Episode 15: 22 June; voted back in the show during the "Bramhastra" week from the Josh Gharana. Finally Eliminated on Episode 35: 31 August
 Raja Hasan from Bikaner, Rajasthan, India – Eliminated on Episode 16: 23 June; voted back in the show during the "Bramhastra" week. Mega finalist and 1st runner-up.

Eklavya
In addition, there was another Gharana called the Eklavya Gharana – it was a "reserved force" of eight singers. The exact purpose of this Gharana was not mentioned during the initial days of the show but soon it was determined that it basically prevented a Gharana from getting eliminated in the initial rounds. The contestants in this Eklavya Gharana performed on the 2nd episode of the show. Later on, each week two contestants from this Gharana were chosen to join a mentor's Gharana after that mentor has had any of his contestants eliminated the previous week.
 Sumana Ganguly from Toronto, Ontario, Canada – transferred to Hit Squad (15 June)
 Sumedha Karmahe from Rajnandgaon, Chhattisgarh, India – transferred to Josh Gharana (18 May)
 Tushar Sinha from India – transferred to Rock Gharana (18 May)
 Anita Bhatt from Lucknow, India – transferred to Rock Gharana (25 May)
 Raja Hasan from Bikaner, Rajasthan, India – transferred to Hit-Squad Gharana (15 June)
 Brijesh Shandilya from Basti, Uttar Pradesh, India – transferred to Yalgaar Gharana (25 May)
The only two contestants who never appeared in the competition after their performance on 5 May 2007 were:
 Sayan Chaudhary from Kolkata, India
 Binoy Mohanty from Raurkela, Orissa, India

Episode themes
Just as was done in previous Sa Re Ga Ma Pa shows, the idea of themes is featured to determine the contestants' versatility and ability to sing different genres.
 Episode 01 – Week 1 (Fri, 4 May) – Introduction to Indian contestants in Gharanas
 Episode 02 – Week 1 (Sat, 5 May) – Introduction to foreign contestants in Gharanas
 Episode 03 – Week 2 (Fri, 11 May) – Songs of R.D. Burman and Asha Bhosle
 Episode 04 – Week 2 (Sat, 12 May) – Modern hit songs
 Episode 05 – Week 3 (Fri, 18 May) – Guru's choice
 Episode 06 – Week 3 (Sat, 19 May) – Contestant's choice
 Episode 07 – Week 4 (Fri, 25 May) – Songs of Bappi Lahiri
 Episode 08 – Week 4 (Sat, 26 May) – Contestant's choice
 Episode 09 – Week 5 (Fri, 1 June) – Songs of Ismail Darbar
 Episode 10 – Week 5 (Sat, 2 June) – Songs of Raj Kapoor
 Episode 11 – Week 6 (Fri, 8 June) – Songs of Himesh Reshammiya
 Episode 12 – Week 6 (Sat, 9 June) – Songs of Rajesh Roshan
 Episode 13 – Week 7 (Fri, 15 June) – Songs of Vishal–Shekhar
 Episode 14 – Week 7 (Sat, 16 June) – Contestant's choice
 Episode 15 – Week 8 (Fri, 22 June) – Contestant's choice (Chakravyuh Phase)
 Episode 16 – Week 8 (Sat, 23 June) – Contestant's choice (Chakravyuh Phase)
 Episode 17 – Week 9 (Fri, 29 June) – Contestant's choice (Bramhastra Phase)
 Episode 18 – Week 9 (Sat, 30 June) – Punjabi or Punjabi flavor songs (Bramhastra Phase)
 Episode 19 – Week 10 (Fri, 6 July) – Contestant's choice (Agnipariksha Phase)
 Episode 20 – Week 10 (Sat, 7 July) – Contestant's choice (Agnipariksha Phase)
 Episode 21 – Week 11 (Fri, 13 July) – Old romantic songs
 Episode 22 – Week 11 (Sat, 14 July) – Rain/Monsoon songs
 Episode 23 – Week 12 (Fri, 20 July) – Club songs
 Episode 24 – Week 12 (Sat, 21 July) – Songs of Salman Khan
 Episode 25 – Week 13 (Fri, 27 July) – Superhits of 60's and 70's
 Episode 26 – Week 13 (Sat, 28 July) – Songs of the contestants' favorite singer
 Episode 27 – Week 14 (Fri, 3 August) – Sad songs
 Episode 28 – Week 14 (Sat, 4 August) – Friendship Day special
 Episode 29 – Week 15 (Fri, 10 August) – Universal hits
 Episode 30 – Week 15 (Sat, 11 August) – Independence Day special
 Episode 31 – Week 16 (Fri, 17 August) – Dance songs
 Episode 32 – Week 16 (Sat, 18 August) – Qawwali
 Episode 33 – Week 17 (Fri, 24 August) – New romantic songs
 Episode 34 – Week 17 (Sat, 25 August) – Songs of Akshay Kumar
 Episode 35 – Week 18 (Fri, 31 August) – TV stars' choice songs
 Episode 36 – Week 18 (Sat, 1 September) – Folk songs
 Episode 37 – Week 19 (Fri, 7 September) – Comedy songs
 Episode 38 – Week 19 (Sat, 8 September) – Songs of the contestants' favorite actor
 Episode 39 – Week 20 (Fri, 14 September) – Black-and-white films' songs
 Episode 40 – Week 20 (Sat, 15 September) – Wedding songs
 Episode 41 – Week 21 (Fri, 21 September) – Stage songs
 Episode 42 – Week 21 (Sat, 22 September) – Round 1: (Raj) Kapoor Family Songs | Round 2: Songs of Kareena Kapoor
 Episode 43 – Week 22 (Fri, 28 September) – Round 1: Ghazals | Round 2: Semi-classical songs
 Episode 44 – Week 22 (Sat, 29 September) – Round 1: Songs of Om Shanti Om | Round 2: Song choice of Shah Rukh Khan
 Episode 45 – Week 23 (Fri, 5 October) – Round 1: Violin Songs | Round 2: Guitar Songs | Round 3: Songs to express yourself (Nokia Express)
 Episode 46 – Week 23 (Sat, 6 October) – Round 1: White Feather Films' songs | Round 2: White Feather Films' emotional songs | Round 3: Song for one of the cast/crew of Dus Kahaniyan

"Mahagurus"
The Mahagurus appeared as judges in the semi-finals. They "commented" and decided who the top contestants were on the performance episodes and also decided who got eliminated on the "elimination day" during the initial rounds.
 Episode 1 & 2 – Week 1 (4 May & 5 May) – None
 Episode 3 & 4 – Week 2 (11 May & 12 May) – Ghulam Ali and Asha Bhosle
 Episode 5 & 6 – Week 3 (18 May & 19 May) – Asha Bhosle
 Episode 7 & 8 – Week 4 (25 May & 26 May) – Asha Bhosle
 Episode 9 & 10 – Week 5 (1 June & 2 June) – Mohammed Zahur Khayyam and Rajesh Roshan
 Episode 11 & 12 – Week 6 (8 June & 9 June) – Mohammed Zahur Khayyam and Rajesh Roshan
 Episode 13 & 14 – Week 7 (15 June & 16 June) – Mohammed Zahur Khayyam and Rajesh Roshan (Roshan was not present on 16 June)
 Episode 15 & 16 – Week 8 (22 June & 23 June) – Anandji Virji Shah

Bramhastra
The "Bramhastra" round ran through Week 9. This round basically allowed the public to bring an eliminated contestant back into the competition. The gharana who received the Bramhastra got to choose two eliminated contestants for the finals (Agnipariksha). Vishal–Shekhar received this Bramhastra and they chose 6 contestants. The six contestants were:
 Sarika Singh (Hit Squad)
 Sunil Kumar (Josh)
 Raja Hassan (Hit Squad)
 Saaberi Bhattacharya (Hit Squad)
 Harpreet Deol (Hit Squad)
 Desh Gaurav Singh (Yalgaar)

Of the six contestants that were chosen by Vishal–Shekhar, the two contestants with most votes from the public and subsequently elected and brought back into the competition were:
 Raja Hassan with 31% of the votes
 Harpreet Deol with 20% of the votes

Top 14 Finalists
The 14 finalists were announced at the end of the episode broadcast on 29 June 2007. That year, Aneek Dhar and Abhijeet Kosambi, winners of the regional spinoffs, Sa Re Ga Ma Pa Bangla and Sa Re Ga Ma Pa Marathi, got direct entry as finalists. Their direct entry into the finals caused some controversy that Ismail Darbar had the courage point out. However, after Himesh Reshammiya pleaded with Ismail, the issue dissolved. See Aneek-Abhijit controversy section for further details.

These are the names of the top fifteen finalists listed in order.
 Aneek Dhar- Winner (Rock Gharana)
 Raja Hassan- 1st Runner Up (Hit-Squad Gharana)
 Amanat Ali- 2nd Runner Up (Yalgaar Gharana)

Eliminated Contestants:
 Poonam Yadav- (Yalgaar Gharana)
 Sumedha Karmahe- (Josh Gharana)
 Mussarat Abbas- (Rock Gharana)
 Mauli Dave- (Josh Gharana)
 Harpreet Deol- (Hit-Squad Gharana)
 Junaid Sheikh- (Hit-Squad Gharana)
 Joy Chakraborty- (Rock Gharana)
 Abhijeet Kosambi- (Josh Gharana)
 Nirupama Dey- (Rock Gharana)
 Apurva Shah- (Hit-Squad Gharana)
 Rimi Dhar- (Yalgaar Gharana)

Celebrity Guests
 Week 6 (8 June) – Mr. Vipin Reshammiya – Father of Himesh Reshammiya
 Week 9 (28 June) – Mrs. Madhu Reshammiya – Mother of Himesh Reshammiya
 Week 9 (29 June) – Director Anil Sharma and Sunny Deol
 Week 11 (14 July) – Shamita Shetty and Dia Mirza
 Week 12 (21 July) – Salman Khan and Lara Dutta
 Week 13 (27 July) – Ritesh Deshmukh and Anubhav Sinha
 Week 13 (28 July) – Vidya Balan and Sajid Khan
 Week 14 (4 August) – Fardeen Khan
 Week 15 (11 August) – Kapil Dev
 Week 17 (25 August) – Akshay Kumar
 Week 18 (1 September) – Daler Mehndi and Lalu Prasad Yadav
 Week 19 (7 September) – Aashish Chaudhary and Asrani
 Week 20 (15 September) – Tusshar Kapoor, Rajpal Yadav and Kunal Khemu
 Week 21 (22 September) – Kareena Kapoor
 Week 22 (28 September) – Pandit Jasraj and Jagjit Singh
 Week 22 (29 September) – Farah Khan, Deepika Padukone and Shreyas Talpade
 Week 23 (5 October) – Adnan Sami
 Week 23 (6 October) – Cast of Dus Kahaniyan (22 guests!)
 Week 24 (13 October) (Finale) – Akshay Kumar, Vidya Balan and Dia Mirza

Semi-finals and finals elimination charts
Contestants are in alphabetical order by last name, then by reverse chronological order of elimination.

Semi-finals
  

  

  

  

* During the week of 22 June, there was no separate Performance/Elimination episode as the week marked the beginning of the "Chakravyuh" phase. However, eight contestants were eliminated that week.

Finals (Top 14)
  

In the Agnipariksha round, eliminations are based on public voting. Public voting is done through SMS, telephone or online. Each week, the contestant with lowest votes is eliminated.

Additionally, if all the contestants of a Gharana get eliminated, the Gharana also gets eliminated and subsequently the mentor(s) have to leave the show.

† During the week of 17 August, there was no eliminated contestant. That week's votes were added to the votes for the week of 24 August, and Junaid was then eliminated on the episode airing on 24 August.

Controversies

Aneek-Abhijit controversy
On 29 June, Aditya Narayan announced that Aneek Dhar and Abhijeet Kosambi, the winners of the regional spinoffs of Sa Re Ga Ma Pa Bangla and Sa Re Ga Ma Pa Marathi, would be getting direct entry as a Top 14 finalist. This was a pre decided qualification as it was a part of their respective prizes of winning the regional contests. The viewers of Marathi and Bangla had already seen and heard this announcement at live telecast on stage when Abhijeet Kosambi and Aneek Dhar had won the respective competitions, so in fact there was no need for any controversy in that case. Yet the mentors did not approve of this saying they should not be allowed to enter the competition in the middle and that they should have come from the beginning. Ismail Darbar tried to walk away from the show stalling the shooting of the program.

In the latter episodes, Abhijeet Kosambi was eliminated with the fewest votes. Aneek Dhar is the only contestant in Himesh Reshammiya's 'gharana'. However Aneek Dhar has been in the Bottom 2 once.
Aneek was also the top contestant thrice in the show and eventually ended up winning it all.

Independence Day controversy
The Independence Day special episode shot on 10 August (Week 15) ran into a controversy when the issue came up of the Pakistani contestants, Junaid, Mussarat and Amanat refused to sing Indian patriotic songs on 15 August special. All work on the sets was stalled for 6 hours. Finally, the Zee TV officials decided that the Pakistani contestants should sing Pakistani patriotic songs as a solution. However, the next week, the three Pakistani singers were the Bottom Three. It was then decided that no contestant would be eliminated that week and the week's votes would be added to the votes of the following week to decide the next elimination.

Sa Re Ga Ma Pa Ek Shaam Taj Ke Naam
Sa Re Ga Ma Pa Ek Shaam Taj Ke Naam was a one-day special episode organised by the SRGMP team as a tribute to the Taj Mahal and also dedicated to request and encourage people to vote for the Taj Mahal as one of the New Seven Wonders of the World.

As well as performances from the contestants of the season, the special episode also featured performances from contestants of previous SRGMP seasons such as Twinkle Bajpai, Sanchita Bhattacharya, Diwakar Sharma and Sameer Mohammed.

Miscellaneous Observations
 According to facts, there are six not four Pakistanis taking part in the competition unlike as shown on the show. The other two Pakistanis who got selected apart from the original Pakistani screening are Imran Aslam from South Africa whose hometown is Karachi  and Amanat Ali from U.A.E. who hails from Faisalabad.
 Raja Hasan's father, Rafiq Sagar has been a playback singer himself and has sung a ghazal for a Bappi Lahiri composition in the 1980 film Pyaara Dushman.

References

External links
 Sa Re Ga Ma Pa Challenge 2007 Official Site

Sa Re Ga Ma Pa
2007 Indian television seasons
Zee TV original programming